Edward Hayes "Eddie" Miller (January 17, 1945 – April 24, 2021) was a racing driver from Colorado in the United States (not to be confused with the racing driver of the same name born October 7, 1895). Miller drove for Carl Haas in Formula Ford and Formula Super Vee. He also competed in Formula 5000 and Indy Car until a near fatal crash during practice for the 1976 Indianapolis 500 curtailed Miller's career. Miller won the United States Formula Ford National Championship twice, in 1972 and 1974, and he won the US Formula Super Vee title in 1975.

American Open Wheel racing results 
(key)

SCCA National Championship Runoffs

Formula Super Vee

Formula 5000 (SCCA L&M Championship)

Indianapolis 500

External links

References

1945 births
2021 deaths
Indianapolis 500 drivers
Formula 5000
People from Lakewood, Colorado
SCCA National Championship Runoffs participants
SCCA Formula Super Vee drivers
Formula Super Vee Champions